Ted Ryan (born 24 March 1957) is an Irish rower. He competed in the men's coxed four event at the 1980 Summer Olympics.

References

External links
 

1957 births
Living people
Irish male rowers
Olympic rowers of Ireland
Rowers at the 1980 Summer Olympics
Place of birth missing (living people)